Slot Racers is a video game for the Atari VCS (later called the Atari 2600) published by Atari, Inc. in 1978. It was the first game written by Warren Robinett, who went on to create one of Atari's most successful games for the 2600, Adventure.

Game play

Slot Racers is a joystick-controlled game with nine game variations programmed within the cartridge.

The object of the game is to pilot your car through a maze, while attempting to fire missiles at your opponent's car as well as evading the missiles your opponent fires at your car.  Each time one of the respective cars is struck by a missile, the player controlling the other car receives one point.  Victory is achieved through the scoring of twenty-five points.  The game itself has four different mazes, and options concerning missile speed, and other factors, within the context of its nine variants, selectable via the Game Select switch.  The difficulty switches control the rate of fire.

Reception
Slot Racers was reviewed by Video magazine in its "Arcade Alley" column where it was described as "a fast-moving head-to-head thriller." Despite noting that the game's plot is patently absurd, and that the game has "virtually nothing to do with either slot cars or racing of any kind", the reviewers called it "a triumph" and ranked it as "the most important of the [Atari 2600]'s classic labyrinth games".

See also

List of Atari 2600 games

References

1978 video games
Maze games
Atari 2600 games
Atari 2600-only games
Multiplayer video games
Video games developed in the United States